Rhys Nicholson (born 22 April 1990) is an Australian comedian and known for being a judge on RuPaul's Drag Race Down Under from 2021 onwards.

Career
In 2014, Nicholson featured in the ABC documentary GayCrashers, alongside Joel Creasey, in which the duo travel to the small town of Colac and perform a stand-up show. Creasey had been the subject of a homophobic attack on an earlier visit to the town.

Rhys Nicholson stars on the show The Weekly with Charlie Pickering.

In 2016, to highlight the importance of marriage equality in Australia, Nicholson publicly married lesbian and fellow comedian Zoe Coombs Marr at the Melbourne International Comedy Festival. That year Nicholson and Coombs Marr were also both nominated for the Barry Award for Best Show, which Coombs Marr won.

In 2021, Nicholson served as a judge on RuPaul's Drag Race Down Under, alongside RuPaul and Michelle Visage. The same year they appeared on the panel show Patriot Brains. Since 2022, they have played Doctor Sarkov in Netflix's The Imperfects.

Live solo shows 

Social Liability (2011)
Almost a Person (2012)
Dawn of a New Error (2013)
Eurgh (2014)
Forward (2015)
Bona Fide (2016)
I'm Fine (2017)
Seminal (2018)
Nice People, Nice Things, Nice Situations (2019)
Live at The Athenaeum (2020)
’’Rhys, Rhys, Rhys’’ (2020, 2021, 2022)

Personal life 
Nicholson is gay, non-binary, and primarily uses they/them pronouns. They live with their fiancé, former Triple J radio presenter Kyran Wheatley, with whom they also established a Melbourne comedy venue in 2019.

Nicholson is the nibling of a member of Machine Gun Fellatio and a keen music fanatic. They have also spoken openly about their struggle with bulimia.

Awards and nominations

ARIA Music Awards
The ARIA Music Awards are a set of annual ceremonies presented by Australian Recording Industry Association (ARIA), which recognise excellence, innovation, and achievement across all genres of the music of Australia. They commenced in 1987. 

! 
|-
| 2017 || Rhys Nicholson Live at The Eternity Playhouse || ARIA Award for Best Comedy Release ||  || 
|-

References

External links
 
 

1990 births
Living people
Australian male comedians
Gay comedians
Australian LGBT comedians
People from Newcastle, New South Wales
People from Sydney
Australian stand-up comedians
RuPaul's Drag Race Down Under
Non-binary comedians